George Ruddell Black (1865 or 1866–1942) was a unionist politician in Northern Ireland.

Black worked as a clothing manufacturer and was elected as an Ulster Unionist Party member of the Belfast Corporation.  In 1942, he was elected as the Lord Mayor of Belfast, but he died after a few months in office.

References

1865 births
1942 deaths
High Sheriffs of Belfast
Members of the Senate of Northern Ireland 1941–1945
Lord Mayors of Belfast
Ulster Unionist Party members of the Senate of Northern Ireland